Paolo Camillo Landriani (c. 1560–1618) was an Italian painter of the late-Renaissance period, active mainly in Milan. He was known also as il Duchino for his habit of living in finery.

Biography
He was a pupil of the painter Ottavio Semini from Genoa. His works in Milan include a Nativity for the Basilica of Sant'Ambrogio and several paintings in the Cathedral of Milan, including the decorations on the "Nivola", a sort of lift used in the cathedral in a yearly celebration of the "Holy Nail" relic. He also painted for Santa Maria della Passione. He died in Milan.

References

1560s births
1618 deaths
16th-century Italian painters
Italian male painters
17th-century Italian painters
Painters from Milan
Italian Mannerist painters